Əlibəyli (also, Alibeyli) is a village and municipality in the Qakh Rayon of Azerbaijan.  It has a population of 1,921. The city is mainly populated by ethnic Georgians.

References 

Populated places in Qakh District